Radijevići  (Cyrillic: Радијевићи) is a village in the municipalities of Novo Goražde, Republika Srpska and Goražde, Bosnia and Herzegovina.

Demographics 
According to the 2013 census, its population was 2 Bosniaks, living in the Novo Goražde part, with no one living in the Goražde part.

References

Populated places in Novo Goražde
Populated places in Goražde